Enid Sung (born 26 August 1994) is an Australian former rhythmic gymnast. She is the 2018 Commonwealth Games bronze medalist with the team. She also competed at the 2010 World Championships.

Personal life 
Sung was born on 26 August 1994 in Kogarah, New South Wales. She studied media and communications at the University of Sydney. She speaks both Korean and English.

Career 
Sung began gymnastics when she was twelve years old. She was coached by 2000 Olympian Danielle Le Ray.

Sung made her international debut at the 2009 Australian Youth Olympic Festival and helped the Australian team win the silver medal behind China. Individually, she won the bronze medal in the all-around. At the 2010 Pacific Rim Championships, she finished ninth in the all-around. She competed at the 2010 World Championships and helped Australia finish nineteenth in the team competition.

Sung was not able to compete for a spot at the 2016 Olympic Games due to a shoulder injury, and although she had retired, she decided to return in 2017 to compete at the 2018 Commonwealth Games. At the 2018 Australia Cup, she won the silver medal in the all-around and was selected to represent Australia at the 2018 Commonwealth Games. She competed alongside Danielle Prince and Alexandra Kiroi-Bogatyreva and won the bronze medal in the team competition. Sung qualified for the all-around final and finished fourth. She also finished fourth in the hoop final, sixth in the ribbon final, and eighth in the clubs final.

Sung retired from competition on 1 February 2019.

References

External links 
 

1994 births
Australian rhythmic gymnasts
Commonwealth Games bronze medallists for Australia
Commonwealth Games medallists in gymnastics
Gymnasts at the 2018 Commonwealth Games
Living people
Medallists at the 2018 Commonwealth Games